Juhani Himanka (born 19 April 1956) is a retired Finnish footballer and Olympian. During his club career, Himanka played for Into Kemi, GIF Sundsvall, OTP Oulu, OPS Oulu, Lillestrøm SK, KePS Kemi and Visa Kemi. He made 16 appearances for the Finland national team, scoring 4 goals. He also competed in the men's tournament at the 1980 Summer Olympics.

References

External links

1956 births
Living people
Finnish footballers
Association football forwards
GIF Sundsvall players
Lillestrøm SK players
Kemi City F.C. players
Olympic footballers of Finland
Footballers at the 1980 Summer Olympics
Finland international footballers
Oulun Työväen Palloilijat players
Mestaruussarja players